Bakhri Assembly constituency is an assembly constituency in Begusarai district in the Indian state of Bihar. The seat is reserved for scheduled castes.

Overview
As per Delimitation of Parliamentary and Assembly constituencies Order, 2008, No. 147 Bakhri Assembly constituency is composed of the following: Bakhri, Dandari and Garhpura community development blocks; Pahsara(East), Nawkothi, Hasanpur Bagar, Rajakpur, Bishnupur, Samsa & Dafarpur gram panchayats of Naokothi CD Block.

Bakhri Assembly constituency is part of No. 24 Begusarai (Lok Sabha constituency).

Election results

2020

Election results

1977-2010
In the 2010 state assembly elections, Ramanand Ram of BJP won the Bakhri seat defeating his nearest rival Ram Binod Paswan of LJP. Contests in most years were multi cornered but only winners and runners up are being mentioned. Ram Binod Paswan of CPI defeated Ramanand Ram of RJD in October 2005 and February 2005. Ramanand Ram of RJD defeated Ram Binod Paswan of CPI in 2000. Ram Binod Paswan of CPI defeated Kameshwar Choupal of BJP in 1995, and Deo Narayan Chaudhary of Congress, in 1990, and Yugal Kishore Sharma of Congress in 1985. Ram Chandra Paswan of CPI defeated Yugal Kishore Sharma of Congress (I) in 1980 and Medni Paswan of  Janata Party in 1977.

Members of Legislative Assembly

References

External links
 

Assembly constituencies of Bihar
Politics of Begusarai district